55 Cygni (55 Cyg) is a blue supergiant star in the constellation Cygnus.  It is thought to be a member of the Cygnus OB7 stellar association at about 2,700 light years.

Its apparent magnitude is 4.86, but this is slightly variable and the star is also called V1661 Cyg.  When first analysed, it was classified as an irregular supergiant variable, but subsequent studies have treated it as an Alpha Cygni variable.  It shows pulsations with multiple periods from a few hours to 22 days, and both p- and g-modes. Apart from p- and g-modes, strange mode and associated instabilities have also been found in models of this star. The spectrum also shows variation, leading to different classifications being given for the star.

The exact properties of 55 Cygni are not known precisely and are also variable.  It is a hot luminous supergiant several hundred thousand times as luminous as the sun.  This star was originally a standard for the B3 Ia spectral type.

The type of pulsations that 55 Cyg exhibits suggest that it was previously a red supergiant that has shed its outer layers.  The most massive red supergiants are expected to pass through a blue supergiant phase before becoming a Wolf-Rayet star and eventually exploding as a type Ib or Ic supernova.

References

Cygnus (constellation)
B-type supergiants
Cygni, 55
Cygni, V1661
7977
198478
102724
BD+45 3291
Alpha Cygni variables